Kanamarua narcissisma is a species of sea snail, a marine gastropod mollusk in the family Colubrariidae.

Description
The length of the shell attains 31.8 mm.

Distribution
This marine species occurs off Indonesia.

References

 Fraussen K. & Lamy D. (2008). Revision of the genus Kanamarua Kuroda, 1951 (Gastropoda: Colubrariidae) with the description of two new species. Novapex 9(4): 129-140

Colubrariidae
Gastropods described in 2008